The King of Fighters fighting game series, produced by SNK, includes a wide cast of characters, some of which are taken from other SNK games. The story takes place in a fictional universe in which an annual series of 3-on-3 or 4-on-4 fighting tournaments are held.

The first game in the series introduces the initial main character of the series, Kyo Kusanagi, a young Japanese fighter who is the heir to a powerful group of martial artists having pyrokinetic abilities. Kyo fights against the Kusanagi clan's enemies, his rival Iori Yagami, and the snake demon Orochi and its human followers, among others. The first four games in the series revolve about these fights, while The King of Fighters '99 introduces a new story arc, revolving around K′, a young man who seeks to destroy the mysterious NESTS organization because they kidnapped him at an early age and stripped him of his past memories, so that they could force him to be a fighter under their control. In The King of Fighters 2003, a new character named Ash Crimson enters the tournament, to steal the powers of the clans who sealed the Orochi in the past for unknown reasons. A new group of antagonists, known as Those From the Past, also appears in the series; they want to obtain Orochi's power for the purpose of giving it to their unknown master.

The plot and the characters came from the Yamata no Orochi legend. There are also several characters in the games that are parodies or homages. Merchandise based on the characters has also been released, including action figures and keychains. The characters have garnered praise from several video game publications for the quality of their designs and movesets. Comments focused on the lack of improvements in some of the characters, but added that the roster is greatly diverse.

Cast creation and influences
The developers of the series claim that their prototype version for King of Fighters was going to be a Double Dragon-style side-scrolling beat 'em up titled Survivor. It would have used only core characters from the Art of Fighting and Fatal Fury series, specifically allowing players to play Robert Garcia and Terry Bogard for location testing. However, the idea was quickly abandoned. Since the developers were attached to the idea of the two series cross-over, they eventually agreed to make their idea into a fighting game. Characters from the Ikari Warriors and Psycho Soldier games were also added in the spirit of other gaming genres considered for their final product. The concept of a three-man team was one of the ideas kept from the side-scrolling version. Flagship director Toyohisa Tanabe asserts that the Art of Fighting and Fatal Fury fighters were added specifically for adults. The newer King of Fighters characters were aimed to appeal to younger and newer audiences. He adds that every original character for the series was added based on the developers' strong desire to make one. For example, he agreed to include characters such as Benimaru Nikaido and Chang Koehan to add an off-beat variety to the cast, which he had previously deemed to be too serious. Later in the series, their approach to creating their characters altered slightly, to also serve as a type of fan service, which he refers to as a collaborative effort between fans and the staff.

Several characters that appear in the series are parodies or homages to either anime, manga, actors, films or television shows that held the creators' interest. Noticeable examples are K9999 and Zero. Characters are sometimes added at the voice actors' convenience, or to fill in gaps that occur for each installment's story; this happens with Duck King in The King of Fighters XI and Ryuji Yamazaki in The King of Fighters '97. Several characters were added to the roster by Eolith's desire when this company sponsored SNK, to attract fans from Eolith's region.

When designing characters for the first King of Fighters game, developers wanted a new, "snazzy" hero who would easily fight against Fatal Fury and Art of Fighting characters. Initially, this character was called Syo Kirishima, but late in the production, his name was changed to Kyo Kusanagi. This was done in order to relate him with the Yamata no Orochi legend, which was used as the inspiration for the first arc (and specifically featured a majestic sword known as Kusanagi no Tsurugi). To continue with the idea of the Orochi plot, the designers gave several other characters, such as Kyo's rival Iori Yagami, similar characteristics to Kyo. In The King of Fighters '99, to contrast the previous protagonist of the series, K' was made to be the "dark hero". K's introduction to the series was meant to remove popular characters Kyo Kusanagi and Iori Yagami from the roster, though this idea was scrapped in the game's release. Due to the large additions of teenager characters in the series, SNK decided to add several middle-age ones to balance them.

Original characters

American Sports Team
 (Heavy D!)
 (Lucky)

The American Sports Team, also known as the U.S.A. Team, is composed of characters originating from the United States of America.

Despite not winning the 94 tournament, in their non-canonical ending, Brian returns to football for his fans while Lucky and Heavy D! will continue street fighting and promise Brian to contact him for further competitions. Unfortunately, the American Sports Team later becomes subject of a running gag in the series, which has them invited to participate in the later tournaments, only to get beaten up and have their invitations stolen by other teams prior to the start of each tournament. The team would make their return in The King of Fighters '98, though it is not canonical in the series, but rather for the purpose of a “dream match” as it features every character up to that point in the canon story-line.

Since then, the American Sports Team have made non-playable appearances in later games of the series as background characters and in other games. However, in the PlayStation 2 version of The King of Fighters 2000, the American Sports Team appear as optional strikers for the Fatal Fury Team with Heavy D! being a striker for Joe, Lucky for Andy, and Brian for Terry.

Antonov

 is a Russian billionaire and the president of his own company, the Antonov Corporation. After being reinvigorated for his love of fighting, he purchases the rights to the King of Fighters brand despite objections from the board members of his company, and announces a new King of Fighters tournament. Proclaiming himself as the “first champion”, he sends out invitations across the world, challenging old and new teams to take his "KOF" championship belt away from him. After the incident caused by Verse at the climax of KOF XIV, the resulting lawsuits had cost Antonov nearly all of his money and damaged his reputation, causing him to briefly disappear from the public. In order to help restore his reputation, Antonov decides to form his own wrestling team named Galaxy Anton Wrestling and is prepared to take part in KOF XV as the leader of Team G.A.W. alongside Mexican wrestlers Ramón and King of Dinosaurs.

Ash Crimson

China Team
 (Shun'ei)
 (Tung Fu Rue)
 (Meitenkun)
The China Team, which is unrelated to the China Team that appeared in The King of Fighters '94, is composed of characters originating from China. First appearing in The King of Fighters XIV, the team consists of Shun'ei, a fighter who wields hydrokinesis in a form of a claw on his right side of his body and pyrokinesis in a form of a fist on his left side of his body, Tung Fu Rue, the legendary master of Hakkyokuseiken who had debuted in Fatal Fury, and Meitenkun, a young fighter who is always holding a pillow and is very sleepy.

Despite having little knowledge of the King of Fighters, Tung convinces Shun'ei and Meitenkun to enter the tournament as a means for them to face off against renowned martial artists from around the world. In addition, Tung saw the tournament as an opportunity to reunite with the Bogard brothers and meet Kyo Kusanagi, the latter after his father Saisyu requested the Japan Team to help Tung's students with their training. During the tournament finals, Shun'ei learns that he possesses a fragment of Verse's power, which causes Verse to go after Shun'ei. After Verse is defeated, the team returns to the Wudang Mountains where Shun'ei tells his teammates that Kyo advised him to continue his training to keep his powers under control to which Shun'ei vows to train harder.

It is revealed that Shun'ei's special abilities had originated from a result of Ash Crimson's act of erasing the latter's ancestor Saiki (and consequentially, his own self) from existence by orchestrating a temporal paradox (via trapping Saiki in the present time), leading to the current events taking place in the KOF universe, with Shun'ei himself wielding a multiversal power known as Amplified Specters, which are the crucible of souls that connects all universes and converging all possibilities in the multiverse. However, these can only be perceived as illusions, and only a limited few are capable of controlling them.

Ever since Shun'ei had inherited two halves of the Amplified Specters from Verse, he has been suffering from recurring nightmares of being ordered to destroy everything in sight until Tung gave him a pair of headphones to help silence the malevolent voice inside Shun'ei's head while also keeping his powers in check. While Tung retires from fighting, Shun'ei and Meitenkun are enlisted to be accompanied by Benimaru Nikaido at Kyo's behest due to Kyo himself having an important mission in teaming up with Iori Yagami and Chizuru Kagura to help investigate the current situation during the events of KOF XV. Once the source behind the awry of Amplified Specters, Otoma=Raga has been defeated, Shun'ei's power is fully under control, allowing Shun'ei to take off his headphones safely.

Chizuru Kagura

 is a member of the Yata clan who holds one of the three sacred artifacts, the Yata Mirror, that originally sealed the serpent monster Orochi eighteen hundred years ago. As the younger heiress of the Yata clan, the other being her older twin sister , Chizuru was raised as a priestess who maintains the duty of keeping the diligent seal on Orochi intact. One night, Goenitz visited their home and destroyed the seal after killing Maki since the Yata Mirror cannot fight Orochi nor Goenitz's strength alone without the aid of the other two clans. Though in a weaken state, Orochi was released from its seal and Goenitz leaves satisfied. Before her death, Maki passes on the responsibilities of the seal to Chizuru, begging her to bring the three clans together to defeat Orochi. Ten years afterwards, Chizuru becomes a very successful and prestigious businesswoman and the owner of Kagura Enterprises. During this time, she secretly kept track with the King of Fighters tournaments since it began with Geese Howard and comes up with an idea to bringing the clans together.

First appearing in The King of Fighters '96, Chizuru hosts the tournament with the goal of bringing together the three clans by entreating Kyo Kusanagi and Iori Yagami to help her replace the broken seal. During the finals of the tournament however, Goenitz appears to finally end all three heirs at once but is defeated by Kyo, with the assistance of Iori and Chizuru. Humiliated, Goenitz takes his own life by cutting his body by his own wind. In the aftermath, both Kyo and Iori protests into working together and leave Chizuru. In The King of Fighters '97, Chizuru hosts the tournament again but this time, requests to join the Women Team with Mai Shiranui and King, which they agree. During the finals of the tournament, Chizuru departs from her teammates and joins up with Kyo and Iori where they confront the remaining Orochi servants: Yashiro Nanakase, Shermie, and Chris. After defeating them, Orochi possesses Chris' body and attempts to destroy the three clans at once. The Sacred Treasures Team successfully defeats him in an intense fight and in a last-ditch effort, Orochi causes Iori to enter the Riot of Blood, expecting him to turn on Kyo and Chizuru. Instead, Iori snares Orochi by the neck, and Kyo obliges his rival by crippling the great demon with one last deathblow, allowing Chizuru to reseal Orochi again.

In The King of Fighters 2003, Chizuru hosts another tournament with her intentions similar to her previous attempt in 1996, but during the tournament, she becomes mind-control by Botan, a member of Those From the Past. She creates an illusion of her late sister Maki and creates a clone from Kyo named Kusanagi to test the strength of the tournament's contestants. Eventually, she breaks free from her mind-control, catches up with Kyo and Iori, and tries to restore the seal of Orochi. However, Ash Crimson seriously attacks her from behind and steals the Yata Mirror from her body before evading Kyo and Iori. While she doesn't appear in The King of Fighters XI, Chizuru asks Shingo Yabuki to enter the tournament with Kyo and Iori to investigate Ash and the weakened Orochi seal as she cannot due to still recovering from her injuries. Unfortunately, the investigation ends with Iori, while in the Riot of the Blood state, nearly killing Kyo and Shingo, and Ash stealing the Yasakani no Magatama from Iori's body and his flames. In the conclusion of The King of Fighters XIII, after Evil Ash erases himself and his ancestor Saiki from existence, both Iori and Chizuru regain their sacred treasures.

After Verse is defeated in The King of Fighters XIV, Chizuru senses Orochi's presence in Hungary. After contacting Kyo and Iori, the trio find an awakened yet weakened Orochi in Aggtelek Karst and seal it away once again. Due to both the ongoing crisis that's taking place in the world and the unexpected return of the New Faces/Orochi Team, Chizuru, Kyo, and Iori decide to join forces in reuniting the Sacred Treasures Team as a regular team for KOF XV.

In the 2010 live-action film adaptation of The King of Fighters, Chizuru is portrayed by Chinese-Canadian actress Françoise Yip.

Duo Lon

Duo Lon (Pinyin: Duòlóng; Japanese: デュオロン Dyuoron) makes his first appearance in The King of Fighters 2003 as a member of the game's Hero Team. His overall look was based on anime title character Vampire Hunter D. He is a member of the assassin group, the Flying Brigands—or —and the half-brother of Xiao Lon. He is an acquaintance of Ash Crimson and Shen Woo.

Hoping to hunt down the clan's traitor, Ron, he agrees to enter the tournament with them. However, after discovering Ash's true objectives, he teams up with Elisabeth Blanctorche and Benimaru Nikaido. Information on Duo Lon's design graph revealed he is one of the nine children of Ron, an assassin who chased after his own father.

Elisabeth Blanctorche

 (spelled "Elisabeth Branctorche" in The King of Fighters XII) is one of three original characters debuting in The King of Fighters XI. Her initial character concept was to be the rival to Ash, though developers decided to change her into a "leading lady" character. The developers also describe her fighting style as "orthodox with subtle tricks [to it]" despite her minimal moveset.

She initially invites Benimaru Nikaido and Duo Lon to France to form the Rival Team. She eventually reveals her acquaintance with Ash Crimson, whom she scolds for seeming to forsake their mission. Elisabeth did not appear in the arcade version of The King of Fighters XII, but was added as one of two characters exclusive to the home release of the game. Like the rest of the cast, she does not have a team for The King of Fighters XII (though the two other members of her team from King of Fighters XI are present in the game). For The King of Fighters XIII, she now appears on a team with Ash's former team members from the 2003 tournament (Shen Woo and Duo Lon), effectively forming what seems to be the new Hero Team.

Though she does not participate in The King of Fighters XIV, she enlists Kukri's help in finding Ash following Verse's defeat, with the two of them succeeding in their mission as Ash's body is soon located in Ukraine's Carpathian Mountains with his soul burning inside it, thus confirming Ash's return to the living world much to Elisabeth's rejoice. In order to help investigate and solve the unknown crisis which seems to revolve around KOF newcomers Shun'ei and Isla, Elisabeth and Kukri join forces with a fully recovered Ash for KOF XV.

Iori Yagami

Japan Team
 (Kyo)
 (Benimaru)
 (Daimon)
 (Shingo)
The Japan Team, also known as the Kyo Team, is composed of characters originating from Japan. First appearing in The King of Fighters '94, the original team consisted of Kyo Kusanagi (草薙 京), a high school student who is the heir to the Kusanagi clan wielding pyrokinetic abilities while also specializing in kenpo,  (二階堂 紅丸 Nikaidō Benimaru?), a professional shoot boxing fighter and model who can create electricity, and Goro Daimon (大門 五郎 Daimon Gorō), a former gold medalist in Judo and mentor to his own dojo.

During the Orochi saga, the Japan Team emerged victorious in the first four tournaments. In the climax of The King of Fighters '97, Kyo, along with his rival Iori Yagami, and Chizuru Kagura, seal away Orochi, saving mankind from destruction. After the fight however, Kyo was kidnapped by a mysterious cartel while Benimaru resumed his modeling career and went on a world tour, and Goro retires from being a fighter and returns to the Judo circuit representing Japan. Also in ’97, Shingo Yabuki (矢吹 真吾 Yabuki Shingo?), a high school student who idolizes Kyo and dreams of being able to wield flames, becomes a friend of the team and appears as an edit entry character.

During the NESTS saga which began in The King of Fighters '99, Benimaru and Shingo are invited to participate in the tournament but were assigned to a “special team” with newcomers K' and Maxima. Winning the tournament, they learned that NESTS was responsible for Kyo's disappearance, and escaped the crumbling base after a brief reunion with Kyo and being separated from K' and Maxima. In The King of Fighters 2000, Benimaru forms his own team, the Benimaru Team with Shingo, and two newcomers: Seth, an old friend of Benimaru and a mercenary, and Lin, a Hizoku clan assassin seeking to find a man named Ron. Following Southtown's destruction from the Zero Cannon, Ron confronted the Benimaru Team but escaped after Benimaru saves Lin from being killed. In The King of Fighters 2001, Kyo reunites with his friends, and as the Japan Team (with Shingo being the fourth member) enter the tournament to battle against NESTS, but also relive their time together as a team. After the tournament was over following NEST's destruction, the Japan Team went their usual separate ways instead of having a party, much to Shingo’s dismay. However, Shingo is scouted by Kyo’s father Saisyu and becoming the elder Kusanagi’s student instead.

In The King of Fighters 2003, Benimaru, Goro, and Shingo enters the tournament as the Benimaru Team while Kyo and Iori going solo to investigate suspicious activities concerning the Orochi and saving their Sacred Treasures teammate, Chizuru. Later, Kyo's team is ambushed by Ash Crimson, who steals the power of the Yata Mirror from Chizuru and vows to steals the powers from both Iori and Kyo. In The King of Fighters XI, Kyo, Iori, and Shingo enter the tournament together at the convalescent Chizuru's behest (Shingo's presence serving ostensibly to keep Kyo and Iori from being at each other's throats) to stop Ash as the '"Kusanagi & Yagami Team". Meanwhile, Benimaru and Duo Lon, a teammate of Ash's team from the previous tournament, are invited by Elisabeth Blanctorche to enter the tournament as the Rival Team to track down Ash. Near the end of the tournament, the growing presence of the Orochi from Magaki causes Iori to snap and enter into the Riot of the Blood state, nearly killing Kyo and Shingo. Ash appears thereafter and steals the Yasakani no Magatama within Iori's body, along with his flames and escapes after a brief confrontation with the Rival Team. In The King of Fighters XIII, Kyo, Benimaru, and Goro enter the tournament to relive their old days as the Japan Team, while Shingo look after Chizuru until her Yata Mirror recovers. Following the tournament, Iori regains Yasakani no Magatama and his flames, and fights Kyo to an unknown outcome.

In The King of Fighters XIV, Saisyu Kusanagi (Kyo's father) informs Kyo of a new threat which will cause untold chaos. On his father's suggestion, he convenes with Tung Fu Rue and Nakoruru to investigate, while entering the tournament with Benimaru and Goro as the Japan Team. After winning the tournament, Kyo advises Shun'ei to keep training to control his powers. At the airport, he tells his teammates to go home without him and travels to Hungary. In Hungary, Chizuru had called him there for his assistance after Iori found a weakened Orochi and seal it together once again. While the Sacred Treasures Team reunite in order to investigate the revived New Faces/Orochi Team in The King of Fighters XV, Kyo had also insist for Benimaru to accompany Tung Fu Rue’s last disciples from the previous tournament, Shun’ei and Meitenkun per the Hakkyokuseiken grandmaster’s request.

Shingo stars as the main protagonist of a gaiden manga series titled The King of Fighters Side Story: The Origin of Flame - Shingo Travels Through Time! Let's Go!, taking place between The King of Fighters XIV and The King of Fighters XV, in which Shingo is unexpectedly brought to the past where the Sacred Treasure Team members’ original ancestors are and finally learns both the origin of their powers and Orochi before returning to the present.

K′

Kim Team
The Kim Team, also known as the Korea Justice Team, and originally the Korea Team, is composed of characters mostly originating from South Korea and are mostly Taekwondo practitioners. First appearing in The King of Fighters '94, the original team consisted of Kim Kaphwan (who had debuted in Fatal Fury 2), a national hero in his homeland of Korea who convince authorities to take in two criminals as part of his new "Rehabilitation Project" with the goal of rehabilitating them of their criminal ways. During the Orochi saga, Chang and Choi would become friends and would always attempt at a chance to escape from Kim's grasp during the end of each tournament but fail due to speaking out loud their scheme near Kim.

During the NESTS saga, Jhun Hoon (Korean:  Jeon Hoon, Japanese:  Jon Fūn), a childhood friend of Kim and rival, took noticed of Kim's rehabilitation project and after seeing the ethics and methods of training towards Chang and Choi, he decides that he would show Kim a more efficient way of management for the criminals and joins the team as the fourth member for the '99 and 2000 tournaments. In The King of Fighters 2001, the team was set to enter the tournament as usual. However, before the tournament started, Jhun broke his right arm while chasing an image of Athena Asamiya, of whom he is a fan of. Down one member, Kim decides to have May Lee, a perky teenager and a student of Kim who have always admired the team, replace Jhun as the fourth member with the task of keeping an eye of Chang and Choi during the tournament. During the tournament, May Lee surprised the audience and her teammates with her unique taekwondo style and gains much praise. When the tournament ended, the team return home and are celebrated as heroes for ending NESTS (despite not actually winning the tournament nor defeating NESTS themselves).

In The King of Fighters 2003, Choi is requested by Jhun to sit out of that year's tournament to watch over Kim's children, allowing Jhun to take his place with the scheme of showing the world the difference in ability between him and Kim due to the tournament's new “free tag-off Multi-Shift rule.” In The King of Fighters XI, Chang and Choi convince Kim to join the Real Bout Fatal Fury Team with Terry Bogard and Duck King as they want Kim to enjoy himself for once after Kim believes that Chang and Choi are finally “rehabilitated.” Following the tournament, Chang and Choi realize that Kim will be on the look out for more criminals to help rehabilitate. Despite being deem “rehabilitated”, Chang and Choi are still in Kim's custody. In The King of Fighters XIII, Kim summons Raiden, a famous heel professional wrestler and Hwa Jai, a former Muay Thai champion who was defeated and lost his title to Joe Higashi in the past, to Southtown after he believes that they are still employed by Geese Howard, and takes them in as his new students. However, unknown to Kim, Raiden and Hwa has since cut their ties with Geese and have already reform for quite some time. Instead, they trick Kim into thinking that they are still working for Geese and enter the tournament with him as a way help boost their reputations as fighters, as well as secretly to prove they are better on fooling Kim than Chang and Choi. Once the tournament ended, Hwa and Raiden pretend to have been "reformed" by Kim, and the gullible Kim falls for it. After parting ways with his new teammates, Kim thinks he might have been "too soft" on Chang and Choi, and to honor his new teammates and the struggles they went through, he intensifies Chang and Choi's strict training much to duo's displeasure.

In The King of Fighters XIV, Chang and Choi are sent to prison after destroying a bar while intoxicated. Upon arrival, the criminals encounter Xanadu, a mysterious, enigmatic, infamous and dangerous criminal who through his eccentric yet mesmerizing charisma, reverts Chang and Choi back to their old criminal ways. Upon the announcement of the new tournament, the trio enter as the Villains Team with the goal of causing chaos and destruction. Meanwhile, Kim has not heard from Chang or Choi and is unaware of their imprisonment. Deciding to go look for them, Kim was about leave the dojo when Gang-Il, Kim's master and chairman of the World Taekwondo Federation, and Luong, a seductive woman who is secretly a freelance secret agent and fell in love with Gang-II during his world tour, appear at the dojo's entrance. Though Gang-II and Luong are excited to meet Kim, Kim's bitter memories of his master distracts him from their conversation until Gang-II shows Kim a leaflet, revealing that Chang and Choi are entering the new tournament with a criminal. As Kim decides to enter the tournament to retrieve Chang and Choi from the criminal's control, Gang-II and Luong also decides to enter alongside Kim in the tournament, despite Kim's objections. Due to Kim and Gang-Il’s absence from the KOF XV tournament via focusing on their Taekwondo training, Luong went to join her fellow secret agents Blue Mary and Vanessa in order to form the Secret Agent Team.

Originally, SNK wanted KOF '94 to have a Prisoner Team, formed by Chang Koehan, Choi Bounge, and a third prisoner, but due to various circumstances, they added in Kim instead and made it the Korea Team. Xanadu was created for XIV to fulfilled this concept. Also, during the development for 2001, May Lee's character design stems from sponsor Eolith's desire for a "Korean Athena Asamiya" that was an "idol-like visual fighter."

Kula Diamond

Lin

Lin (Pinyin: Lín; Japanese: 麟 Rin) is one of the new characters introduced in The King of Fighters 2000 as a member of the Benimaru Team. He, along with the Flying Brigands subplot, was created without the entire staff's knowledge, leading to some developers being surprised by his team's ending.

Though he is no longer an active member in King of Fighters, his story and character have not been abandoned. He is a member of the assassination group, The Flying Brigands—or  Clan in Japanese—which is apparently on the brink of ruin. The agent Seth entices him to enter the King of Fighters tournament in order to find their clan's missing leader, Ron.
After learning that Ron had defected to NESTS for his personal greed, Lin tracks the activities of NESTS' renegades, K′ and his teammates, in hopes of finding his traitorous leader. He joins up with K', Maxima, and Whip in the 2001 tournament. He continues to search for Ron even after NESTS' destruction. For an unexplained reason, he appears next to Ron in the Psycho Soldier Team's ending in The King of Fighters XI. He is a master of the Poison Hand technique, which enables the user to turn their own blood into venom.

Malin

 is a character who debuts in The King of Fighters 2003 as a member of the High School Girls Team (alongside Athena Asamiya and Hinako Shijou). Her addition to the series was due to Choi's absence in the game where she debuted. The game producers state that her name should be spelled "Malin" and not "Marin", adding that "this is the humble preference of the supervising designer and a mystery to us all".

She becomes a member of the Anti-Kyokugenryu Team in The King of Fighters XI due to her animosity towards one of the style's practitioners, Yuri Sakazaki.

Maxima

 debuts as a member of the Hero Team in The King of Fighters '99. He was added to the cast with the desire to add a "somber and reliable middle-aged character" to counteract the introduction of multiple teenage characters. Both he and his former deceased partner Rocky are inspired by two characters of the same names from the 1991 SNK beat 'em up arcade game Robo Army.

Maxima was a Canadian soldier who led a normal life until he found out that his comrade-in-arms Rocky was killed in an incident involving NESTS. To avenge Rocky's death, he abandons his ordinary life. In order to infiltrate the NESTS cartel without being recognized, Maxima was transformed into a cyborg, with his strength and reaction time increased to superhuman levels, built-in weapons, and the ability to conduct instant data analysis. He also has some degree of cyberpathy. He infiltrates NESTS and is assigned to be the partner of K′. They both defect from the cartel after K' encounters his clone, Krizalid, and grows sickened by the organization. Since then, he has become K's steadfast companion and he is often the one who enters both of them into the following tournaments.

Official Invitation Team
 (Sylvie Paula Paula)
 (Kukri)
 (Mian)
The Official Invitation Team is composed of characters that Antonov personally invited to participate in his tournament. First appearing in The King of Fighters XIV, the team consists of Sylvie Paula Paula, a remnant of NESTS who wields electromagnetic powers, Kukri, a mysterious fighter from North Africa (presumably Mali) who utilizes sand-based fighting techniques while hiding his face with a hood at all times, and Mian, a Sichuan opera dancer and fighter. Prior to the tournament, each member lives in the underground society with Mian and Sylvie often taking part in underground tournaments together.

During the end of the final match, Kukri reveals that he is familiar with Verse, especially since half its power lies within Shun'ei. When the tournament ends, Kukri leaves his teammates and Antonov behind and travels to the Carpathian Mountains in the Ukraine where he finds Ash Crimson. Kukri is soon joined by Elisabeth Blanctorche, revealing that she had hired Kukri to enter the tournament to find and rescue Ash whose soul resided inside Verse.

Kukri is the main antagonist of a spin-off sequel between The King of Fighters XIV and The King of Fighters XV titled SNK Heroines: Tag Team Frenzy, in which Kukri himself kidnaps and sends most of the female participants from the XIV tournament into his personal pocket dimension, alongside Jeanne d'Arc from the World Heroes series, Thief Arthur from Million Arthur, and a recently resurrected Shermie, as well as swapping genders of male fighters Terry Bogard, Iori Yagami (going under his previous alias Miss X from SNK Gals' Fighters), and Skullomania from Fighting EX Layer.

It is revealed in The King of Fighters XV that Kukri’s cynical attitude had been originating from the death of his master and adopted mother Dolores, who had sacrificed her life to save him after the former had suddenly awakened his sand power while being unable to initially control it at first. Although he did find Ash for Elisabeth, he still wasn't able to find Dolores elsewhere until he became relieved to learn of his master’s revival while watching her interview for the next KOF tournament on television. Back when Kukri was adopted by Dolores, he had learned the existence of Amplified Specters, the same multiversal-based power that Shun'ei inherited from Verse, which Kukri initially disbelieved at first.

Oswald

 appears in The King of Fighters XI as a member of the game's Hero Team, along with Ash Crimson and Shen Woo. An Irish professional assassin who utilizes a card-based fighting style in attacking his opponents with razor-sharp cards, he was created as an older gentleman, and is an enigma to even the creators. Developers consider his moves to be comical compared to the seriousness of his image, especially when the move "Joker" is blocked or misses. They chose to leave the result of his fight with Shen ambiguous, implying that fans would have been disappointed with the outcome. He was originally intended to be the "good-looking glasses" character for the series.

It is revealed at the end of the tournament that Oswald joins Ash and Shen Woo to obtain money and drugs named Dragon Pills. Ash agrees to give information regarding the drug to Oswald, explaining that it can only be given to him if he defeats the provider's enemy, Shen Woo. Oswald would later make his return as a DLC character in The King of Fighters XIV.<ref>
 was first introduced in The King of Fighters '94, he is a recurring boss in The King of Fighters fighting game series. As the host of the tournaments from The King of Fighters '94 and 95, Rugal plans to turn all the competitors from the tournament into stone statues as part of his collection of defeated martial artists. Despite his death in 95, Rugal is still featured in The King of Fighters titles which do not contain a storyline (nicknamed "Dream Matches"). He has also been featured in the SNK Vs. Capcom as a boss character.  His character has periodically appeared in other media related to The King of Fighters franchise, including comic adaptations and The King of Fighters live-action film, and portrayed by British martial arts actor Ray Park. As the first boss character from The King of Fighters, the SNK staff created him to be one of the most difficult characters to defeat. His Omega Rugal form from 95 has been noted by the staff to be their favorite boss to the point they added him in the Dream Match titles. Publications for video games and other media have provided praise and criticism for Rugal's character.  The concept for making Rugal in The King of Fighters '94 was to make "the mightiest (most violent) and most evil boss character ever". Despite the difficulties in defeating him, Rugal has become the boss character with the biggest number of appearances in series.

In The King of Fighters XIV, he is one of the souls inside Verse until his resurrection at the end of the game via Verse's defeat. He returned as Omega Rugal in The King of Fighters XV as not only a free DLC character, but also a boss character as well in the game's "Boss Challenge" mode.

 Adelheid and Rose 

 (Adel for short), along with his younger sister, are the only known children of Rugal Bernstein. They reside in an airship called "Sky Noah". Adel is a boss character from The King of Fighters 2003, as well as a secret and mid-boss for The King of Fighters XI. They were added to the series to create an alternate story to the main plot.

Despite sharing several physical and fighting traits with Rugal, Adelheid is an honorable fighter who exhibits good sportsmanship, even having a friendly conversation with Heidern, Rugal's mortal enemy. Rose, however, was developed to be extremely prideful and selfish, possessing her father's negative traits. At the end of The King of Fighters XI, Rose is manipulated by Botan, a member from the mysterious organization Those From the Past to use her in their plans, leading to the events of The King of Fighters XIII.

Hakkesshu

The Hakkesshu ( in the Japanese version) are a group formed by the eight most powerful followers of the god Orochi. The four top members are referred to as "Kings". Gaidel, the biological father of Leona, was also a member of the group, but when he refused Goenitz's offer to continue the Orochi's will, Goenitz manipulated Leona into killing Gaidel and the rest of her fellow villagers. The criminal Ryuji Yamazaki is part of the group, but does not want to get involved with them.

 Vice & Mature 

 and  appear as members of Iori's Team in The King of Fighters '96. The designers at the time created both Vice and Mature with the image of a "cruel woman" and a "ruthless woman", respectively. Their origin story is mostly based on the notion of Rugal employing secretaries prior to The King of Fighters '96. Both women were unavailable during location testing and were likely finished near the end of the game's production schedule. Aside from serving Rugal, both women were also spies and wielders of Orochi. They are ordered by their superior Goenitz to keep an eye on Iori, but both of them are killed by Iori.

Since then, both have appeared in the "dream match" games The King of Fighters '98 and The King of Fighters 2002 (games in the King of Fighters series with no canonical connection). Vice has also appeared in Capcom vs. SNK: Millennium Fight 2000 and the sequel.  Mature is a playable character in The King of Fighters XII, exclusive to the home console version of game.

With Vice's return in The King of Fighters XIII, Iori's 1996 team is reunited for the first time since The King of Fighters 2002. In The King of Fighters XIII, both women are spirits, reflecting their fates at the end of the 1996 tournament. With the rise of a new Orochi crisis brought on by Ash Crimson's meddling, they convince Iori to enter the new tournament to settle matters and stop whatever it is Ash has in mind.

The duo returns in The King of Fighters XIV to team up with Iori once more since The King of Fighters XIII. After witnessing the possible return of Orochi, they quietly return to the shadows from once they came.

In The King of Fighters XV, the two are briefly mentioned in Iori's background story telling him that they would stand back and watch him from the audience this time, resulting in the duo not participating in the tournament that year.

In the 2010 live-action film adaptation of The King of Fighters, Vice is played by Bernice Liu, and Mature by Monique Ganderton.

 Goenitz 

 is one of the Four Heavenly Kings of Orochi, with the power to command the element of wind. Goenitz has a very polite personality which is reflected in his winning poses and his elegant, somewhat flowery speech. Even though influenced by Orochi, he sports the same messianistic attitude that aspires to bring about "salvation" expected from people of religious occupations.

During the 1996 tournament, Goenitz discovers that Chizuru Kagura plans to gather warriors to seal the Orochi and heads there to stop her. In addition to this, Goenitz is the one who took Rugal's right eye, who in turn Rugal took Heidern's own right eye. Depending on the playable characters, Goenitz is either killed by Iori Yagami and Kyo Kusanagi, sealed by Chizuru, or commits suicide at the end of KOF '96.

According to the manga adaption of KOF XIV titled The King of Fighters: A New Beginning, it is confirmed that Goenitz is one of the souls inside Verse. Following his revival after KOF XIV, Goenitz is dismayed about his fellow Heavenly Kings/Orochi Team members being split into two halves, but despite this, both the normal and awakened forms of the Orochi Team are still determined to carry out Orochi's mission while also trying to avoid the Ikari Warriors' current surveillance towards them.

 Orochi Team 
 (Chris)
 (Shermie)
 (Yashiro)
The original New Faces Team, also known as the Orochi Team is a group from The King of Fighters '97. They are three of the Four Heavenly Kings of Orochi. The group is composed of a young Swedish boy named  who utilizes a swift fighting style that relies on quick movements, a beautiful but shady Frenchwoman named  who specializes in Joshi puroresu and a tall Japanese guitar player named  who utilizes a fighting style that combines powerful strikes with a few aspects of capoeira. They initially enter due to Yashiro's grudge against Iori and his own band (which had overshadowed a performance of theirs before the tournament), but as the tournament progresses, the Orochi blood inside their bodies soon awakens, causing them to remember their status as three of the Four Heavenly Kings. As loyal members of Orochi, they continue to gather power for the awakening until they are forced to kill themselves in order to resurrect Orochi through Chris' body, a concept that began early in the game's production. Using the Orochi power, they are stated as the Japan Team's counterparts, since they have their same abilities: Chris is able create flames like Kyo Kusanagi and Iori Yagami, Shermie creates lightning like Benimaru Nikaido, and Yashiro has enormous strength enough to shatter the earth like Goro Daimon.

Having been dead for years after the events of KOF '97, Ash Crimson’s suicidal action at the end of the XIII tournament had caused their souls to reside within a creature known as Verse during the XIV tournament. When Verse is defeated, the New Faces/Orochi Team's souls are released from it, leading to both their resurrection as of the canonical spin-off crossover SNK Heroines Tag Team Frenzy and return in KOF XV. However, their revival causes their awakened Orochi personalities to split from them into separate entities unlike Goenitz and much to their own dismay. Despite this, both the normal and awakened forms of the Orochi Team still vow to carry out Orochi's mission while also trying to avoid the Ikari Warriors' current surveillance towards them.

Orochi

 is the final boss of The King of Fighters '97, and can be considered the main antagonist of the series as most villains either serve it or wants to use its powers for their own ends. Its character origin is another interpretation of the mythical eight-headed serpent demon, Yamata no Orochi. In The King of Fighters series, it is a chthonic supernatural being that is the will of Gaia. It has no distinct gender. It does not regard humanity as trustworthy with regard to coexisting with the planet without ravaging it, and so seeks to extinguish humanity. It was sealed 1,800 years ago by the three sacred treasures of Japan. The three clans' descendants are charged with protecting the seal. In The King of Fighters '97, it incarnates in Chris (a herald of Orochi) to save the Gaia.

It is sealed again at the end of the '97 tournament by the three descendants of the users of the three sacred treasures (Kyo, Chizuru and Iori), but the seal is later broken (though not to the point of actually releasing it) by the demon Mukai at the end of The King of Fighters 2003. A clone of Orochi appears as a boss in NeoGeo Battle Coliseum named Mizuchi.

In The King of Fighters XIV, Orochi is one of the many souls inside Verse as shown through Verse's win quote against Kyo and in the ending of Team Yagami, as it lands in Aggtelek-Karst in Hungary, it is sealed away once again due to being in its still weakened state.

The NESTS cartel
NESTS is a mysterious and dangerous cartel that deals with drugs, weaponry, robotics, genetics and biotechnology. The global crime syndicate was involved in the events behind the King of Fighters tournaments held between 1999 and 2001. They are responsible for the creation of the Kyo Kusanagi clones and K′ being injected with Kyo's DNA. The group is composed of several agents who have different aims, but they all want to become more powerful. The cartel is destroyed with the death of their leader Igniz. However, some of its loyalists are still on the loose and branded as wanted criminals while its former agents manage to defect from the organization.

 Krizalid 

 acts as the mid and final boss of The King of Fighters '99. He was designed to be a stylish and earnestly strong boss, though the supervising designer at the time admits, "I think I overdid it a little."

He is made to be the ultimate Kyo clone, outfitted with a special suit to feed the data of fighters into his body during battle. He also happens to be a clone of K′. As a side effect, he gained some of K's memories and believed that Whip was his sister. He is ordered to activate the thousands of Kyo clones around the world so that they can attack in a simultaneous strike. After his defeat against K', his superior, Zero, neutralizes the Kyo clones and kills Krizalid by throwing a boulder to crush him. He is later revived by the original Zero and fights alongside him in the 2001 tournament.

In The King of Fighters XIV, he is one of the souls inside Verse.

 Ron 

Ron (Pinyin: Lóng; Japanese: 龍(ロン) Ron) is first introduced as a sub-plot character in The King of Fighters 2000. He later appears as a Striker for Zero in The King of Fighters 2001. Though he is not playable in the series, he serves as an important side-story character.

According to his official profile, his main objective is to gain the ability to manipulate the dead. He is the former leader to an elite assassination group known as the Flying Brigands— Clan in Japanese—and the father to a number of their members, including Duo Lon and Xiao Lon. He betrayed the Flying Brigands by joining NESTS for personal gain, labeling himself as a traitor by many of the group's members, including Lin, his former pupil. After NESTS' destruction, he reveals his great interest in a mysterious power shared by Sie Kensou and Bao known as the Dragon Spirit.

 Zero 

 
 is one of the higher-ranked agents of NESTS. The designer, C.A.C. Yamasaki, admits basing Zero off a certain character from the manga Fist of the North Star. Zero begins to secretly build his own weapon from NESTS' technology called the "Zero Cannon". He sets his plans into motion in The King of Fighters 2000. There, he impersonates a military commander named Ling and uses his persona as a decoy to stop the military resistance against him. Depending on whether or not the player defeats Kula, his plans are foiled by either Heidern or Kula, who is sent to execute him for his treacherous acts. While dying, he tells Whip of who she really was, angering her to shoot him dead.

He was created because the supervising designer of his character claimed to be dissatisfied with Zero's design in 2000. Unlike his clone, Zero is extremely loyal to the NESTS syndicate, and was disgusted to learn of his clone's attempted coup d'état. Willing to clear the reputation of his clone's actions, Zero is commanded to destroy the winners of The King of Fighters tournament. He traps the winning team in a space ship that was disguised as a blimp. When he is defeated, he urges the team to escape the collapsing ship and dies honorably on board the vessel. His true loyalty is toward Igniz’s father, Nests, with Zero himself not knowing of Igniz’s later betrayal towards his own father.

 NESTS Team 
  (Ángel)
  (K9999/Krohnen)
  (Foxy)
  (Nameless)
The NESTS Team is a group that appears in The King of Fighters 2001, entering in the tournament to eliminate anybody who would try to destroy their organization. Due to copyright issues, for The King of Fighters 2002: Unlimited Match remake, he was replaced with a similar character. The character is called "Nameless", a clone from both Kyo and K' (whose hair, reflecting this, is half brown like that of Kyo, and half white like that of K') who uses two types of flames to fight, while equipped with an Anti-K glove to keep his flame power in check, created from the DNA of his deceased lover who looks like Kula, Isolde.

When their boss Zero dies from his battle upon the blimp that takes the winning team to the headquarters of NESTS, Kula and Foxy decide to leave NESTS in order to begin a new life, but the two are attacked upon sight by their teammates, who consider them traitors. K9999 and Ángel mortally injure Foxy in the fight and waste no time in attacking Kula, but when they are about to defeat her, she is rescued by K′, whose abilities make the attackers flee in an instant. After the destruction of NESTS, Kula, Foxy, and Diana decide to work together with K′, Maxima, and Whip, leading to Kula joining forces with K' and Maxima in The King of Fighters XI after Whip returns to the Ikari Warriors team. Ángel returns in The King of Fighters XIV as part of Team Mexico which also includes Ramón (who ironically was one of the agents seeking to shut down NESTS) and Tizoc (now fighting under the persona "King of Dinosaurs"). In addition to this, a failed test subject victim of NESTS named  serves as a member of the Official Invitation Team for KOF XIV, with Sylvie being described as a "cute-looking psycho" who can freely manipulate electricity and considers the voice in her head and her eyeball decorations to be her "friends". Before The King of Fighters XV, Àngel and Kula (the latter having a falling out between her and K') are recruited by K9999 (who now goes under the new name Krohnen McDougall), with the three of them set to compete in KOF XV as a new team known as Team Krohnen, representing their status as former NESTS agents.

 Igniz 

 is the final boss in The King of Fighters 2001. His handsome and youthful appearance was specifically created at the sponsors' request.

Although Igniz had served his father, the previous leader of NESTS also named Nests with utmost loyalty, he had secretly sought to overthrow him and become the new leader of NESTS, seizing the opportunity to do so near the end of the 2001 tournament, to which NESTS was hosting. Upon succeeding in murdering his own father and becoming the new leader of NESTS, Igniz decides to test his newly-acquired power against the finalists in the hopes of crushing them and becoming a new god. His ambition is short-lived, however, as he is defeated by the K' Team. Cursing his failure and declaring himself a demon instead, Igniz attempts to destroy the planet by plummeting NESTS' main headquarters out of orbit; his attempt fails, and Igniz dies in the process.

In The King of Fighters XIV, Igniz is one of the souls inside Verse.

Those From The Past
 are a new group of antagonists that make their debut in The King of Fighters 2003. They are mysterious, and supposedly inhuman, warriors who want to get the power of the Orochi so that they can give it to their shrouded master. It is implied that they are the European counterparts of the Orochi Clan. The organization is destroyed after Saiki's death by Ash in The King of Fighters XIII, but their actions triggered the birth of Verse.

 Mukai 

 is the hidden final boss in The King of Fighters 2003. His appearance was designed with the concept of petrification in mind. Mukai's primary power is his control over many things related to stone. He can form stone, either in crude rocks to throw at foes, or as elaborate pillars to crush them. He speaks in very pious, grandiose declarations, but appears to have a cautious attitude toward the potential of humans.

Mukai appears in The King of Fighters 2003 tournament, seeking strong opponents to test his strength against them. Mukai reveals that his group had organized the tournament so that they could break the Orochi seal and give its power to the group's unknown leader. Mukai wanted to battle against the winning team of the tournament, seeing if they had what it takes to survive in "the new age". Mukai is defeated, but manages to escape. He would later return in The King of Fighters XIII, but is killed by Saiki after disobeying his boss.

 Shion 

 makes his first appearance in The King of Fighters XI as the sub-boss. The character was conceptually designed to be one of Ron's daughters, though developers decided to change his gender to startle and appeal to fans with his androgynous appearance. Shion is an enigmatic character whose past is unknown. He works as an underling for the demon Magaki, and seems knowledgeable about the workings of Orochi. After being defeated at the ruins of the tournament finals, he is dragged through an extradimensional gate. However, after Magaki is defeated at the end of the tournament, Shion kills him and his whereabouts remain unknown. In King of Fighters XIII, as the last cutscene, the head of Shion's spear appears. The cutscene is named The Crimson Spear. It is shown that he's still alive as he appeared before Shroom and Rimelo.

 Magaki 

 is the final boss of The King of Fighters XI. Not much is known about Magaki and his past history. Like his partner Mukai, Magaki wants to awake Orochi and give Orochi's powers to his own master. He also shows even less respect for humans in general, believing them to have little-to-no potential, and being weak overall. He also seems to have very little tolerance for not getting what he wants from others. Like Mukai before him, after he was defeated he stood up, apparently unscathed, and made his exit into another realm after commenting that perhaps it was more than spirit that was needed to awaken Orochi. However, as he finally realizes the error in his plan, he is killed by Shion's spear, hurled from the dimensional rift he was escaping from.

He is notable for his ability to teleport projectiles around the screen, including behind his opponent. As a result, many players have compared fighting him to playing bullet hell games.

 Saiki 

 is the main antagonist of The King of Fighters XIII, being revealed as the leader of Those From the Past while serving as the sub-boss of the game. He is able to control the flow of time due to a gate that can halt the timeline so long as it is open. During the game's cutscenes, he takes the appearance of a human, very similar to Ash Crimson. Before taking on the player's team, Saiki drains Mukai of his power after the latter disobeys a direct order, killing him in the process while transforming into a red demonic being. After the battle, Ash takes his power, seemingly killing him. This plan backfires as Ash ends up being possessed by Saiki and turns into a shadowed version of himself called Evil Ash (known by fans as Dark Ash) to act as the game's final boss. During the ending, Saiki is defeated, but tries to use the gate to rewind time again in an attempt to restart his plot once more; Ash stands in his way and prevents his passage. When the gate closes, Saiki is finally killed, but it is revealed that he is Ash's ancestor, thus by denying Saiki passage into the past, Ash forces his own existence to cease. Despite this, Ash's soul would later reside within Verse during The King of Fighters XIV and after the latter's defeat, Ash would eventually be revived in the living world.

Characters from other SNK games
Art of Fighting Team
 (Ryo)
 (Robert)
 (Takuma)
 (Yuri)
The Art of Fighting Team is composed of characters originating from the video game series with the same name (which canonically and chronologically also originating the titular KOF tournaments through Art of Fighting 2), and are mostly practitioners of Kyokugenryu Karate (also known as Kyokugen), a fighting style created by the Sakazaki family. First appearing in The King of Fighters '94, the original team consisted of Ryo Sakazaki, the heir to Kyokugenryu Karate who is the first champion of KOF tournaments, Robert Garcia, a wealthy practitioner who is Ryo's best friend and rival, and Takuma Sakazaki, Ryo's father and the founder of Kyokugenryu Karate who trains the students at the dojo, and Ryo and Robert's master. After The King of Fighters '95, Takuma decides to retire from competing due to his age catching up with him which leads to Robert suggesting that Yuri Sakazaki, Takuma's daughter, Ryo's sister, and Robert's love interest, becomes his replacement for the next tournament. Beginning with The King of Fighters '96, Yuri becomes the third member of the team for the remainder of the Orochi Saga.

During the NESTS Saga, Takuma comes out of retirement and joins the team as the fourth member in The King of Fighters '99. In The King of Fighters 2000, Yuri wanted to show her independence by joining the Women Team that year by begging King, a French Muay Thai fighter who has a history with the Sakazaki family in the past, to be her replacement, and because she is like a family to them. While Ryo and Takuma welcomed the idea, Robert disagreed and challenged King to a kicking contest to prove herself. Although the contest ended in a tie, Robert was impressed with King's kicking ability that he agreed to let King join the team. In The King of Fighters 2001, Robert and his father Alberto Garcia are facing a takeover in their company, the Garcia Foundation, after they and the rest of the world suffers from a financial crisis due to NESTS’ increased activities after the last tournament. After pleading to the Sakazaki family to enter the tournament to win the prize money, they agreed to help Robert and his family (in reality, Takuma wanted to win the prize money for himself to help with the family's dojo).

Despite not winning the 2001 tournament, the financial crisis that Robert and his father faced seem to have been resolved as by The King of Fighters 2003, Robert is joyfully wealthy again and enters the tournament with Ryo and Yuri. When the team returns home from the tournament, they found Takuma laying facedown on the dojo floor, apparently after being assaulted by an unseen assailant. Takuma tries to tell them who attacked him, but passes out, and is taken away in an ambulance. In The King of Fighters XI, it is revealed that Takuma was not attacked by an assailant but actually, he collapsed due to malnutrition, liver problems, and other health issues. He uses the incident as an excuse to fulfill his wishes for a grandchild by asking King to enter the tournament with Ryo and Yuri, and be his replacement since Robert cannot enter because of a disaster that took place at his father's company that his presence is required for the issue to be resolved. In The King of Fighters XIII, the Sakazakis get into a family argument after Yuri cuts her hair which Takuma and Ryo disapproves of. When Robert tells Yuri that her family wants her to quit her training (more so, to stop entering King of Fighters tournaments and fighting overall to prevent serious injury to herself), Yuri decides to enter the tournament with King and Mai Shiranui to show her independence once again, and to show her family how much her Kyokugen has improved. When Takuma (who has made a full recovery) finds out that Yuri is entering the tournament with another team, he, Ryo, and Robert, who now has enough free time away from his father's company, enter the tournament. When the tournament ends, the team, alongside Yuri and King, are being interviewed by the media that Robert pulls out an engagement ring while Yuri is answering questions. Takuma takes notice of the ring and Robert's intentions that he hits Robert from behind, which leads to the two men hitting each other without notice while Yuri embarrasses King by telling reporters that she wishes King becomes a part of the family. Ryo then proclaims that teamwork is the key to Kyokugen's success.

In The King of Fighters XIV, the team have since opened up their own restaurant called “Kyokugen BBQ” with the help of Richard Meyer. In addition to entering the tournament as usual to attract new students, the team plans on promoting their new restaurant. After returning home from the tournament, the team throws a private party to themselves where Ryo and his student, Khushnood Butt (from Garou: Mark of the Wolves), become displeased with Robert and his family's attitude regarding their training, and are more focused on improving the restaurant. In The King of Fighters XV, Ryo excludes Yuri from the team since she's spent less time training and invites King to join him and Robert instead. After the tournament, Ryo dons a tengu mask and becomes Mr. Karate II to convince Robert and his family to focus more on their martial arts training.

Fatal Fury Team

The Fatal Fury Team is composed of characters originating from the video game series with the same name. First appearing in The King of Fighters '94, the original group consisted of Terry Bogard, an American fighter who sought to defeat the evil crime lord Geese Howard in order to avenge the death of his father Jeff Bogard; Andy Bogard, the younger brother of Terry who uses the Shiranui fighting style; and Joe Higashi, a Muay Thai fighter and mutual friend of Terry and Andy. In The King of Fighters '99, Mai Shiranui, a Shiranui kunoichi, and love interest of Andy, joins the team as during this time, teams are now composed of four fighters. Blue Mary, a female agent and love interest of Terry, and decides to help her out in her job by teaming up with her in the 2000 and 2001 editions of the King of Fighters tournaments.

In The King of Fighters 2003, Terry and Joe entered the tournament with Tizoc, a famous Mexican professional wrestler as Andy took care of his Shiranui disciple Hokutomaru who fell sick with the mumps. In The King of Fighters XI, Terry organizes a new Fatal Fury Team with Duck King and Kim Kaphwan. In The King of Fighters XIII, Terry wanted to catch up and reunite the Fatal Fury Team with Andy and Joe once again. In The King of Fighters XIV, Terry, Andy, and Joe enter the tournament in order to not only enjoy themselves, but also to investigate Geese's suspicious involvement from within the competition itself.

Garou Team
The Garou Team (known as the Mark of the Wolves Team in Japan) first appears in KOF XI, containing characters that appear in the video game Garou: Mark of the Wolves. The team includes Tizoc, a famous Lucha libre pro wrestler, Gato, a powerful yet emotionless martial artist and a modern-day female pirate named B. Jenet. Though the members become good friends during the course of the tournament, Gato decides to leave them after the end of the tournament in order to avoid Hotaru Futaba from finding him and getting herself involved in his personal quest. The team returned in The King of Fighters XV as DLC, with Geese's biological son and Kain R. Heinlein's nephew Rock Howard (who was previously a DLC character in KOF XIV) replacing Tizoc due to the latter becoming King of Dinosaurs for his own personal reasons.

Geese Howard's teams
The villain known as Geese Howard, who is the original creator of the KOF tournaments since the events of Art of Fighting 2, creates several teams in the series. In The King of Fighters '95, he sends his right-hand man Billy Kane to kill his enemies, the Bogard Brothers. Billy allies with Iori Yagami and Eiji Kisaragi to form a Rival Team in the tournament, but once they fail to obtain the victory, Iori brutally attacks them and nearly kills Billy and Eiji in the process.

In The King of Fighters '96, Geese creates the Boss Team, which consists of himself, Wolfgang Krauser, and Mr. Big. Geese uses both Krauser and Big as pawns in the tournament, hoping to get the power from the Orochi entity while Krauser only wants to prove his strength in seeking a rematch against Terry and avenging his pass loss towards him and Mr. Big seeks to regain his status as the undisputed crime lord of South Town's criminal underworld from Geese, vowing to one day eliminate him.

As the Boss Team disbanded at the end of The King of Fighters '96, Geese creates and sponsors his own team known as the Outlaw Team for the same purpose. The team for the KOF '97 tournament is made up of Billy Kane, Blue Mary, and Ryuji Yamazaki. The team would later appear in The King of Fighters 2003, with Blue Mary being replaced by Gato.

Geese eventually returns to the tournament in The King of Fighters XIV, where he becomes the main leader of the South Town Team, which consists of him, Billy, and Geese's personal butler named Hein. The team returns in The King of Fighters XV as DLC, with Yamazaki (who was previously a DLC character in KOF XIV) replacing Hein. It is later revealed that Hein, alongside Luong are in fact secret agents working with certain organizations, whereas Hein goes undercover as Geese's butler and even secretly enlists Yamazaki to figure out what Geese's next plan is during the fourth saga.

Ikari Warriors Team
The Ikari Warriors Team is a group of mercenaries that enters in each tournament in the series in order to find well-known criminals and capture them. The leader  established the team in order find the criminal Rugal Bernstein, in order that Heidern could get his revenge against Rugal (who killed Heidern's wife Sandra and their daughter Clara). The other two recurring members of the team are the soldiers Ralf Jones and Clark Still, who were originally the player characters in Ikari Warriors and its sequels.

, Heidern's adopted daughter introduced in The King of Fighters '96, replaces him as he takes on a more active role behind the scenes, investigating occurrences parallel to the tournament. Although she tends to be very quiet, Leona was conceived to be an Orochi descendant at the time of her debut, and her designers took special care to let their interests at the time reflect in her actions. Her official nickname is The Silent Soldier. Although she recovers from her childhood trauma at the end of King of Fighters '97, she leaves the team after attacking her friends in the Riot of the Blood state at the conclusion of King of Fighters 2003 and tries to regain her focus from within her personal time.

 appears in The King of Fighters '99 as the new member to the Ikari Team. She is a clone of K′s sister
and once worked for NESTS as an assassin. She is eventually assigned to Heidern's mercenary unit for The King of Fighters tournament to investigate NESTS and the mysterious fighter known only as K'. Once she realizes who K' is, she reveals their relation to him and joins him in his objective to destroy the NESTS cartel. After NESTS' downfall, she returns to her duties under Heidern's command. One of her moves depicts her shooting her opponents with a Desert Eagle-like handgun. The firearm is edited from the American release of the games in arcades, but is uncensored in the home release versions.

Leona, Ralf, and Clark compose the Ikari Team for The King of Fighters XIII, reflecting the team's roster from the 1996 tournament. Despite her difficulties in controlling herself leading her to sit out the XI tournament as Whip took her place, Leona commits herself to entering the XIII tournament, deciding to accept, and deal with, her Orochi blood.

Ever since Verse's incident at the end of The King of Fighters XIV, Heidern and the Ikari Warriors have been investigating the unknown threat left behind by Verse, leading to Heidern meeting and befriending not only a resurrected Malian medium named Dolores, but also a cynical Chilean graphic artist named Isla who utilizes a multiversal Specter power similar to Shun'ei's own and in due time, the three of them form a new Rival Team for KOF XV.

Psycho Soldier Team
The Psycho Soldier Team specializes in using a combination of Chinese martial arts and psychic powers—dubbed "Psycho Powers" by SNK. He participates with his students throughout the tournaments since 1994, but leaves the competition in 2003 to observe thoroughly the matter of Orochi's possible resurgence, asking K′ and Maxima to investigate the tournament in his place for activity, meaning both Kensou and Chin are replaced with Hinako and Malin.

The others members of the team are Chin's students Athena Asamiya, a famous Japanese pop singer and idol; a Chinese teenager infatuated with Athena named , with the two of them originally the player characters in Psycho Soldier; and a little Chinese boy named . As Bao trains with them during the time between King of Fighters '97 and King of Fighters '99, Kensou gradually loses his powers, until they become obsolete. However, his powers are recovered in King of Fighters XI, causing Ron and Misty to take an interest in it, revealing a probable importance of the Dragon Spirit.

A young girl who trained with Kensou and Athena, also debuts in the team in The King of Fighters XI. She was added into the cast to fit the image of the younger Psycho Soldier team, though the developers have expressed discomfort with adding so young a character amongst a large group of adults. In addition, Momoko's discipline is Capoeira, rather than Chinese Martial Arts like her teammates. Chin and Kensou make their latest appearances in The King of Fighters XII; in The King of Fighters XIII, the Psycho Soldier team is re-formed and represented by the original members.

Heroines Team
The Heroines Team, also known as Women Fighters Team is a group composed exclusively of heroines, christened "The Princesses of Punch." The team first formed by the Kyokugen karate prodigy Yuri Sakazaki, the kunoichi Mai Shiranui, and the Muay Thai fighter King. Throughout the later games of the series, there are several changes in the members of the team, as Yuri is sometimes called to join the Art of Fighting team, leading her to be replaced by the heir of the ancient Yata clan Chizuru Kagura and Kasumi Todoh—a young female martial artist who seeks to defeat those who practice Kyokugen karate. In later games, new characters appear, due to the new rule of using four members; these include the agent Blue Mary, the Chinese-American female martial artist Li Xiangfei and the sumo fighter . In 2003, the Women Fighters Team has a subdivision with young girls as the members, hence the reason it is named the High School Girls Team (also known as the Pretty Girl Fighters Team in 2002 UM). This team is led by Psycho Soldier leader Athena Asamiya, and the two other members are Hinako and Malin. In XI, the team is dissolved, since the members go to other teams or they have other things to do. The Women Fighters Team is reunited for The King of Fighters XIII, featuring the three original members from the 1994 tournament. In XIV, the team returns with Mai and King getting a new member named Alice, an avid fan of Terry Bogard who inspires to be just like him. At King's permission request while she returns to the Art of Fighting Team with Ryo and Robert, Athena is allowed to be the leader of an advance team for KOF XV known as the Super Heroines Team, alongside the Women Fighters' original members Mai and Yuri.

Another World Team
 (Mui Mui)
 (Love Heart)
The Another World Team is composed of characters who appeared in other SNK games outside of The King of Fighters universe. First appearing in The King of Fighters XIV, the team consists of Nakoruru, an Ainu miko who fights alongside her pet hawk Mamahaha and is from Samurai Shodown, Mui Mui, the last successor of her clan and a master of Kung Fu from Dragon Gal, and Love Heart, the captain of the Peace Pirates from Sky Love.

In her world, Nakoruru senses a terrible entity emerging after a crack in the spacetime continuum. With the source coming from another universe, Nakoruru transports herself into the present universe with the goal of preventing the disaster and finding its true source. Shortly after arriving at the present universe, Nakoruru encounters Love Heart, who was transported by the same entity unwillingly, and agrees to help investigate the phenomenon. During their investigation, the duo meets Mui Mui, who transported herself to the present universe willing in search of gems filled with mysterious powers and joins them. Upon the announcement of the new tournament, the trio decides to enter in hopes of finding the source. During the finals, the source was revealed to be Verse. Following Verse's defeat and the end of the tournament, the team travels to Russia where Nakoruru believes that Verse may return one day, but is unsure when the entity will come back. While Love Heart and Mui Mui are ready to return to their own worlds, Nakoruru instead decides to stay in the present universe to visit modern-day Hokkaido and China, inviting her teammates to travel with her. While Mui Mui agrees with the idea, unfortunately for Love Heart, she is dragged along by her teammates much to her annoyance.

Samurai Shodown Team
The Samurai Shodown Team, known simply as Samurai Team''' is composed of characters originating from the Samurai Shodown series. Originally meant to debut The King of Fighters '95, the team would've consisted of Nakoruru, a ronin vagabond named Haohmaru, and an American ninja named Galford D. Weller, who fights alongside his pet dog Poppy. However, the idea was dropped due to time constraints. Because of the fourth saga's storyline involving the concept of time and space within a multiverse, this would enable the original plan to truly come to fruition, thus the Samurai Team would finally make their debut in The King of Fighters XV via a downloadable pass, with the sole exception of Galford being replaced by the female newcomer Darli Dagger from Samurai Shodown (2019), a strong African ship-maker who wields a jagged saw-sword named Libertalia while being raised by pirates in Merina Kingdom, Madagascar.

Following the fourteenth tournament incident caused by Verse, to which Nakoruru is displaced in the modern timeline along with other characters from outside The King of Fighters multiverse, her home timeline is also affected as well, bringing the warriors she once knew into the present KOF timeline. Among the warriors Nakoruru found and immediately team up with were her old friends, Haohmaru and Darli Dagger. Realizing that the mysterious yet dangerous threat of Otoma=Raga might somehow be connected to the current situation that the fighters are facing at the moment, Nakoruru, Haohmaru, and Darli join the fight, presumably to possibly return to their home timeline. After the events of KOF XV, the trio find themselves encountering a recently revived Mizuki Rashojin (from Samurai Shodown II), to which they decide to have her come along with them in continuing to explore the modern world, much to Mizuki's personal reluctance.

Reception
The characters from The King of Fighters series were said to be a varied cast by Eurogamer magazine, since the cast includes characters from other SNK games. IGN agreed, commenting that every character has their own unique moves and praising their visuals, even though the magazine mentioned that the characters have old two-dimensional designs. IGN criticized that learning the characters' special moves was difficult. In reviews for the first game, IGN praised the main character Kyo Kusanagi as one of the most enjoyable characters to play, remarking on his dynamism and movesets. GameSpot also praised the characters designs, saying they "shine through, resulting in a cast of characters that's diverse and not plentiful". In other reviews, they complained about the lack of improvements in the character's movesets in some games, and also mentioned that some techniques were simply removed. They noted that, while new characters introduced in some games are interesting, they do not have the same impact as other ones.

1UP.com labelled the characters from the series as one of SNK's best creations, claiming that their appearances and quotations are all "cool"—although they commented some of the storylines are "nonsense". The boss characters were criticized by multiple reviewers for being too difficult to defeat, with Krizalid from The King of Fighters '99 being singled out as too powerful.

The character designs in Maximum Impact were praised by IGN, which noted that the conversion to three-dimensional modeling had "extremely vibrant" characters with "a decent amount of detail." However, they disliked the lack of blood, especially during violent attacks, saying the super moves and combos were "just not as spectacular here" as they were in previous installments. IGN sharply criticized the "terribly bad voice acting", calling it "truly piss-poor American dub work." Gamezone added that some characters still remain their unique fighting style, but complained about the lack of individualized endings, and commented that some of the attacks have less style in 3D. GameSpot also added that the English voices weren't distinctive, but commented that their new outfits were "pretty wild".  The characters, however, were "just not done with the same pixel-perfect flair" as the 2D versions, they said, noting that "you'll recognize [the characters] because of their clothes and special moves, not because of their faces."

Action figures, puzzles, keychains, and pins have been produced based on the characters in the King of Fighters'' series.  Many characters are also featured on posters, wallpapers, and trading cards.

References

External links
 Characters' entry at The King of Fighters official website

King of Fighters
 
Lists of video game characters